Camponotus pallidiceps is a species of ant in the genus Camponotus. Described by Emery in 1887, the species is restricted to New South Wales.

See also
List of ants of Australia
List of Camponotus species''

References

pallidiceps
Hymenoptera of Australia
Insects described in 1887